Lansdowne is a census-designated place and planned community located near Leesburg, Virginia in Loudoun County, Virginia. The population as of the 2010 United States Census was 11,253.
It is north of State Route 7 and south of the Potomac River. Before the Revolutionary War, the Lee family established Coton Manor here. A section of the Potomac Heritage Trail runs through Lansdowne. It is the home of Inova Loudoun Hospital, the Jack Kent Cooke Foundation, Lansdowne Resort, Prison Fellowship, and Lansdowne Woods of Virginia, a gated, age-restricted community.

Lansdowne is part of the Washington metropolitan area.

Geography
It is bordered to the south, across Route 7, by Belmont and Ashburn, while to the northeast, across the Potomac River, it is bordered by Montgomery County, Maryland.

Goose Creek flows northward through the northwestern part of the CDP, entering the Potomac River at the northern edge of the community, between the River Creek golf course community to the north and Elizabeth Mills Riverfront Park to the south.

Homeowners' associations
There are three principal residential homeowners' associations in Lansdowne. The largest is the Lansdowne on the Potomac HOA, which represents over 2,200 homes in the Lansdowne area, adjoining the Potomac Station community to the west along Riverside Parkway. The second is Lansdowne Woods of Virginia, a HOA consisting of five condominium associations totaling 1,057 homes. The third is Lansdowne Village Greens (The Homes Lansdowne Town Center), which represents over 500 homes surrounding the Lansdowne Town Center area between Riverside Parkway on the north, Route 7 on the south, Belmont Ridge Road on the west and the Lansdowne Country Club Golf Course on the east.

Education
Students in Lansdowne are served by Loudoun County Public Schools. Children who live in the western area of Lansdowne attend elementary school at Seldens Landing Elementary School in Lansdowne. Children who live in the eastern area of Lansdowne attend elementary school at Steuart W. Weller Elementary School in Ashburn. Middle school students attend Belmont Ridge Middle School in Lansdowne. High school students attend Riverside High School, also located in Lansdowne. In the past, students have attended Tuscarora High School (2010-2015), Stone Bridge High School (2002-2010), Eagle Ridge Middle School (2002-2003), and Belmont Station Elementary School (2008-2013).

See also

The National Conference Center, located in Lansdowne

References

External links
Homeowners associations:
Lansdowne on the Potomac
Lansdowne Woods of Virginia
Lansdowne Village Greens

Census-designated places in Loudoun County, Virginia
Census-designated places in Virginia
Washington metropolitan area